Berekum West is one of the constituencies represented in the Parliament of Ghana. It elects one Member of Parliament (MP) by the first past the post system of election. Berekum West is located in the Berekum Municipal District of the Bono Region.

Boundaries 
The seat is located within the Berekum Municipal District of the Bono Region of Ghana.

Members of Parliament

Elections

References

See also 
 List of Ghana Parliament constituencies
 List of political parties in Ghana

Parliamentary constituencies in the Bono Region